Pennisetum polystachion, the mission grass, is a species of grass native to tropical Africa, and is an invasive species in Northern Australia and in Sri Lanka.

References

External links

polystachion
Invasive plant species in Sri Lanka